WSM Music Group Ltd.(WSM) is an entertainment company in Hong Kong founded in 1992. The scope of business includes record production and distribution, music publishing & song licensing, audio & video recording licensing, concert organiser, artiste management, professional rehearsal room rental and CD direct sales marketing.

History
The company includes WSM Entertainment Ltd. in artiste management and concert production, and WorldStar Music Int’l Ltd.in production & distribution. Record music label musicNEXT, a young iconic brand to create the supernova artistes is the wholly owned subsidiary of WSM Entertainment Ltd.

WSM Entertainment Ltd.
Founded in 2002, WSM Entertainment Ltd. specializes in repackaging classic singers. WSM Entertainment Ltd. artistes include Rosanne Lui, Wan Kwong, Nancy Sit, etc. Business includes artiste management and concert production, also to arrange performance for their artistes and singers, as well as advertising spokesperson.

WorldStar Music Int'l Ltd.
Founded in 1992, WorldStar Music Int’l Ltd. The scope of business includes recording, production, distribution, direct marketing, business of music copyright, music publishing and agency, and the introduction and promotion of European, American and Southeast Asian original classic songs.

List of WSM Entertainment Ltd. artists
 Nancy Sit
 Rosanne Lui
Lee Heung-kam
 Donald Cheung
 Alice Lau
 Lau Ying Hung
 Suzan G
 Dianna Tse
 Yang Yan
 Wan Kwong
 Jonny Ip
 Peter Chan
 Joe Mok
 Ching Shan
 Xie Lei
 Lin Chong
 Edith Au
 Amy Wong

List of musicNEXT artists
 Angela Au
 Kellyjackie
 TikChi
 Lily Chen
 Gloria
 Fred Cheung
 Stephanie Ho
 Abo
 Eunice Chan

References

External links
Official WSM Music Group Ltd. site

Record labels established in 1992
Pop record labels